11552 Boucolion  is a Jupiter trojan from the Trojan camp, approximately  in diameter. It was discovered on 27 January 1993, by Belgian astronomer Eric Elst at the CERGA Observatory in Caussols, France. The dark D-type asteroid is one of the 90 largest Jupiter trojans and has a long rotation period of 32.4 hours. It was named from Greek mythology after the Boucolion, who lost his sons in the Trojan War.

Orbit and classification 

Boucolion is a dark Jupiter trojan in a 1:1 orbital resonance with Jupiter. It is located in the trailering Trojan camp at the Gas Giant's  Lagrangian point, 60° behind its orbit . It is also a non-family asteroid of the Jovian background population. It orbits the Sun at a distance of 4.5–6.1 AU once every 12 years and 1 month (4,418 days; semi-major axis of 5.27 AU). Its orbit has an eccentricity of 0.15 and an inclination of 15° with respect to the ecliptic.

The body's observation arc begins with its official discovery observation at Caussols in January 1993.

Physical characteristics 

In the SDSS-based taxonomy, Boucolion is a D-type asteroid, the most common type among the larger Jupiter trojans. It has also been characterized as a D-type by Pan-STARRS' survey, while the Collaborative Asteroid Lightcurve Link assumes it to be a carbonaceous C-type asteroid.

Rotation period 

In September 2012, a rotational lightcurve of Boucolion was first obtained from photometric observations by astronomers at the Palomar Transient Factory (PTF) in California. Lightcurve analysis gave a rotation period of 16.150 and 16.177 hours with a brightness amplitude of 0.23 and 0.25 magnitude in the R- and S-band, respectively.

A more refined, alternative period solution of  hours with an amplitude of 0.21 magnitude was measured by Robert Stephens at the Center for Solar System Studies in January 2015. The result seems to be a 1:2 alias, i.e. twice the period, of the previously obtained lightcurve at the PTF. While not being a slow rotator, Boucolion has one of the longest periods among the larger Jupiter trojans (see table below).

Diameter and albedo 

According to the surveys carried out by the Japanese Akari satellite and the NEOWISE mission of NASA's Wide-field Infrared Survey Explorer, Boucolion measures 51.136 and 53.91 kilometers in diameter and its surface has an albedo of 0.062 and 0.035, respectively. CALL assumes a standard albedo for a carbonaceous asteroid of 0.057 and calculates a diameter of 53.16 kilometers based on an absolute magnitude of 10.1.

Naming 

This minor planet was named from Greek mythology after Boucolion, father of the two Trojan warriors Pedasos and Aesopos, who both were slain near the River Scamander during the Trojan War. The official naming citation was published by the Minor Planet Center on 6 January 2003.

Notes

References

External links 
 Asteroid Lightcurve Database (LCDB), query form (info )
 Dictionary of Minor Planet Names, Google books
 Discovery Circumstances: Numbered Minor Planets (10001)-(15000) – Minor Planet Center
 
 

011552
Discoveries by Eric Walter Elst
Named minor planets
19930127